Petrus Tun (19 March 1936 – 23 March 1999) was a Micronesian politician, who played an important role during the first days of Micronesian independence and in the Trust Territory times that preceded them.

Tun was elected to the Senate of Micronesian Congress from Yap district. He was instrumental in negotiating the first Compact of Free Association between the FSM and the United States and later served as the first Vice President of the Federated States of Micronesia during the first term of President Tosiwo Nakayama (1979–1983).

After concluding his tenure as the nation's first vice-president, he served as special advisor to Yap's first Governor, John Mangefel, until he himself was voted as Yap's 2nd Governor of Yap. In addition, he held other high positions in both government and private industries. He would later be the Chairman of the FSM Delegation that negotiated the Amended Compact of Free Association with the United States that went into effect in 2004.

Despite his wish, after his death, the widely respected Tun was honored by a state funeral, which was attended by a large crowd including fellow Founding Fathers of the FSM, and laid to rest in his Municipality of Gagil.

References

Micronesian Diary

1936 births
1999 deaths
Vice presidents of the Federated States of Micronesia
Governors of Yap
Members of the Congress of the Trust Territory of the Pacific Islands
Members of the Congress of the Federated States of Micronesia